The year 1725 in music involved some significant events.

Events 
March 25 (Palm Sunday) – First performance of Johann Sebastian Bach's chorale cantata Wie schön leuchtet der Morgenstern, BWV 1, at St. Thomas Church, Leipzig.
March 30 – Repeat performance of Johann Sebastian Bach's St John Passion (BWV 245, BC D 2b [including BWV 245a, b, and c]) at St. Thomas Church, Leipzig (using parts from his Weimarer Passion).
Giovanni Battista Pergolesi goes to Naples to study under Gaetano Greco. Domenico Scarlatti is also in Naples at this time.
Nineteen-year-old Giovanni Battista Martini is appointed chapel-master of the Franciscan church at Bologna.

Publications 
Johann Sebastian Bach – Notebook for Anna Magdalena Bach, Book 2
Joseph Bodin De Boismortier 
6 Sonatas for 3 Flutes, Op. 7
6 Sonatas for 2 Flutes, Op. 8
Johann Fux – Gradus ad Parnassum (Vienna)
Concerti di flauto, violini, violetta, e basso di diversi autori (24 concertos for recorder, strings and continuo) with works by Alessandro Scarlatti, Mancini, Valentine, Barbella, Domenico Natale Sarro, Giovanni Battista Mele. Undated manuscript, Naples: Biblioteca del Conservatorio di musica S. Pietro a Majella, c.1725.
François Couperin – L'Apothéose de Lully (Paris)
John Loeillet – 12 Trio Sonatas, Op. 2 (London)
Marin Marais – Pièces de viole, Livre 5 (Paris)
Georg Philipp Telemann – Harmonischer Gottes-Dienst (continues 1726)
 Antonio Vivaldi – Il cimento dell'armonia e dell'inventione, Op. 8 (contains The Four Seasons though they were likely written earlier)

Classical music 
Johann Sebastian Bach  
Ach Gott, wie manches Herzeleid, BWV 3, premiered Jan. 14 in Leipzig
Bleib bei uns, denn es will Abend werden, BWV 6, first version premiered Apr. 2 in Leipzig
Schwingt freudig euch empor, BWV 36, first version
Am Abend aber desselbigen Sabbats, BWV 42
Selig ist der Mann, BWV 57, premiered Dec. 26 in Leipzig
Also hat Gott die Welt geliebt, BWV 68, premiered May 21 in Leipzig
Ihr werdet weinen und heulen, BWV 103, premiered Apr. 22 in Leipzig
Unser Mund sei voll Lachens, BWV 110, premiered Christmas in Leipzig
Liebster Immanuel, Herzog der Frommen, BWV 123, premiered Jan. 6 in Leipzig
Meinen Jesum lass ich nicht, BWV 124, premiered Jan. 7 in Leipzig
Musette in D major, BWV Anh.126
Herr Jesu Christ, wahr' Mensch und Gott, BWV 127, premiered Feb. 11 in Leipzig
Auf Christi Himmelfahrt allein, BWV 128, premiered May 25 in Leipzig
Süsser Trost, mein Jesus kömmt, BWV 151, premiered Dec. 27 in Leipzig
Tue Rechnung! Donnerwort, BWV 168, premiered Jul. 29 in Leipzig
Er rufet seinen Schafen mit Namen, BWV 175, premiered May 22 in Leipzig
Es ist ein trotzig und verzagt Ding, BWV 176, premiered May 25 in Leipzig
Sie werden euch in den Bann tun, BWV 183, premiered May 13 in Leipzig
Zerreißet, zersprenget, zertrümmert die Gruft, BWV 205, premiered Aug. 10 in Leipzig
Oster-Oratorium, BWV 249, premiered Apr. 10 in Leipzig
George Frideric Handel – Trio Sonata in D minor
Johann Adolf Hasse – Antonio e Cleopatra
Benedetto Marcello – O prole nobile di magni principi, S.628
Wilhelm Hieronymus Pachelbel – Toccata in G Major
Christian Petzold – Minuet in G major (formerly attributed to J.S. Bach as BWV Anh.114)
Giovanni Benedetto Platti – 12 Cello Sonatas
John Sheeles – Suites of Lessons for the Harpsicord or Spinnett

Opera
Attilio Ariosti – Dario
Antonio Caldara – Venceslao
George Frideric Handel – Rodelinda, regina de' Longobardi, HWV 19
Leonardo Leo – Zenobia in Palmira
Nicola Porpora – Siface
Georg Philipp Telemann – Pimpinone, TWV 21:15
Pietro Torri – Venceslao
Leonardo Vinci 
Astianatte, premiered December 2 in Naples
Didone abbandonata, composed. Premiered 1726.
Elpidia, premiered May 11 in London
Il trionfo di Camilla
 Antonio Vivaldi – L'inganno trionfante in amore, RV 721

Popular music
 Henry Carey – Sally in Our Alley

Births 
April 20 – Johann Friedrich Klöffler, German conductor, composer (died 1790)
July 24 – John Newton, clergyman and poet ("Amazing Grace") (died 1807)
August 15 – Ferdinando Bertoni, Italian composer and organist (died 1813)
November 8 – Johann George Tromlitz, flautist (died 1805)
December 25 – Esteban Salas y Castro, Cuban composer (died 1803)
probable – Joaquim Joze Antunes, harpsichord maker (died c.1790)
 ca 1725 – Antonio Lolli, Italian violinist and composer (died 1802)

Deaths 
January 27 – Silvio Stampiglia, librettist (born 1664)
February 7 – Johann Philipp Krieger, composer (born 1649)
October 3 – Jean-Baptiste Drouart de Bousset, composer (born 1662)
October 22 – Alessandro Scarlatti, opera composer, father of Domenico (born 1660)
date unknown 
Mathieu Lanes, composer (born 1660)
Robert de Visée, lutenist (born c. 1650)
probable – Christian Ritter, composer

References

 
18th century in music
Music by year